Roseți is a commune in Călărași County, Muntenia, Romania. It is composed of a single village, Roseți.

As of 2007 Roseți has a population of 5,976.

References

Communes in Călărași County
Localities in Muntenia